Decastylocarpus is a genus of flowering plants in the daisy family.

There is only one known species,  Decastylocarpus perrieri, endemic to Madagascar.

References

Monotypic Asteraceae genera
Endemic flora of Madagascar
Vernonieae
Taxa named by Jean-Henri Humbert